Issoumaila Dao (born 9 August 1983 in Abidjan) is an Ivorian former professional footballer who played as a defender.

In August 2008, he played games on trial for English Championship clubs Doncaster Rovers and Wolverhampton Wanderers.

His half-brother, Hassan Lingani, is also a professional footballer.

References

External links
 
 

Living people
1983 births
Footballers from Abidjan
Ivorian footballers
Association football defenders
Ivory Coast international footballers
Ligue 1 players
Ligue 2 players
Championnat National players
Toulouse FC players
SC Bastia players
US Boulogne players
Al-Raed FC players
Ivorian expatriate footballers
Ivorian expatriate sportspeople in France
Expatriate footballers in France
Ivorian expatriate sportspeople in Saudi Arabia
Expatriate footballers in Saudi Arabia